The Rule of the Congregation (1QSa) is an appendix to one of the first seven Dead Sea Scrolls discovered in caves near the Qumran site in 1946. Three related sectarian documents were discovered in Qumran Cave 1: The Community Rule (1QS), The Rule of the Congregation (1QSa), and The Rule of the Blessing (1QSb). The Rule of the Congregation and the Rule of the Blessing were at first overlooked by researchers and considered a continuation of the much longer Community Rule.

Since their discovery, the two passages have been called many names, including The Messianic Rule, The Charter for Israel in the Last Days, The Rule of the Benedictions, and A Priestly Blessing for the Last Days. The book’s Hebrew names are Serekh ha-‘Edah, and Serekh ha-Berakhot.

References 
Phillip R. Davies, George J. Brooke and Phillip R. Callaway.  "The Complete World of the Dead Sea Scrolls,"  London: Thames and Hudson, 2002.
Michael O. Wise, Martin G. Abegg Jr., and Edward M. Cook. "The Dead Sea Scrolls: A New Translation,"  San Francisco: HarperSanFrancisco, 2005.
Lawrence H. Schiffman, “Community (Rule of the),” The Anchor Bible Dictionary.  Ed. David Noel Freedman, Gary A. Herion, David F. Graf, John David Pleins, Astrid B. Beck. New York: Doubleday, 1992. 450.
Lawrence H. Schiffman, The Eschatological Community of the Dead Sea Scrolls.  Atlanta: Scholar’s Press, 1989.
Lawrence H. Schiffman, “Rule of the Congregation.” The Encyclopedia of the Dead Sea Scrolls.  Ed. Lawrence H. Schiffman and James C. Vanderkam.  Oxford: Oxford University Press, 2000. 797-799.

Dead Sea Scrolls
Essene texts